Michael Keenan (born 5 April 1956) is a Northern Irish retired goalkeeper. He was successful with Portadown during the 1990s and early 2000s, where he won four league titles and several cup winner medals, as well as being named the Ulster Footballer of the Year for the 2001–02 season.

He played for Oldham Athletic, Newry Town, Ards, and Lisburn Distillery. In 2002, he became the oldest person to play in the UEFA Champions League when Portadown took part in a qualifying round against FC Belshina Bobruisk. After retiring as a player, Mickey returned to Newry as a goalkeeping coach and is now currently first team coach at Newry City.

References

1956 births
Living people
Association footballers from Northern Ireland
NIFL Premiership players
Portadown F.C. players
Ards F.C. players
Newry City F.C. players
Ulster Footballers of the Year
Oldham Athletic A.F.C. players
Sportspeople from Newry
Association football goalkeepers